Nokia X3 may refer to:
                                         
Nokia X3-00
Nokia X3-02, also called Nokia X3 Touch and Type, available in Q3 2010